Jazz Sébastien Bach (released as Bach's Greatest Hits  in North America) is the debut album released by the Paris-based Swingle Singers.  The album was a 1964 Grammy award winner for "Best Performance by a Chorus" and the group also won the 1964 Grammy award for "Best New Artist".

All tracks from the album are included on the CD reissue / compilation Jazz Sebastian Bach (together with all tracks from 1968's Jazz Sébastien Bach Vol. 2) and on the 11 disk Philips boxed set Swingle Singers.

Track listing
all compositions by J. S. Bach
Side 1:
"Fugue in D Minor", Contrapunctus 9 from The Art of the Fugue – 2:14
"Prelude for Organ Chorale No. 1" (Choral-Prelude BWV 645 "Wachet auf, ruft uns die Stimme", from the Schübler Chorales) – 2:38
"Aria" from Suite No 3 in D – 3:17
"Prelude No 12 in F Minor" from The Well-Tempered Clavier, Book II" – 2:12
"Bourrée II" from The English Suite No 2" – 1:44
"Fugue No 2 in C Minor" from The Well-Tempered Clavier, Book I" – 1:16
"Fugue No 5 in D" from The Well-Tempered Clavier, Book I – 1:38
Side 2:
"Prelude No 9 in E" from The Well-Tempered Clavier, Book II – 3:19
"Sinfonia" from The Partita No 2 – 4:54
"Prelude No 1 in C" from The Well-Tempered Clavier, Book II – 1:56
"Canon" (4-Part Canon BWV 1073) – 1:53
"Two Part Invention No 1 in C" – 1:22
"Fugue No 5 in D" from The Well-Tempered Clavier, Book II – 3:15

Personnel
Vocals:
Jeanette Baucomont – soprano
Christiane Legrand – soprano
Anne Germain – alto
Claudine Meunier – alto
Ward Swingle – tenor, arranger
Claude Germain – tenor
Jean Cussac – bass
Jean Claude Briodin – bass
Rhythm section:
Pierre Michelot – double bass
Gus Wallez – drums
Andre Arpino – drums

References / external links
Philips PHM 200-097 & Philips PHS 600-097
Bach's Greatest Hits at discogs.com and at [ allmusic.com]
Philips B 77.921 L & Philips 840.519 BY
Jazz Sébastien Bach at discogs.com and at allmusic.com

The Swingle Singers albums
1963 debut albums
Philips Records albums
Covers albums
Grammy Award for Best Performance by a Chorus
Arrangements of compositions by Johann Sebastian Bach